Dosti is a 1971 Pakistani romantic musical film directed by Sharif Nayyar and produced by Ejaz Durrani who also played the leading role in the film along with Shabnam and Abdur Rahman (actor). The film was released on 7 February 1971, was Diamond jubilee success at box office. It was also released in the UK. The film was shot in Northern areas of Pakistan (Naran, Kaghan) and the UK.

The film became popular due to its music which was composed by A. Hameed. "Chitthi Zara Saiyaan Ji", "Roothe Saiyaan" and "Yeh Wadiyaan" were the big hits from the film. At the 1971 Nigar Awards, the film won the highest number of awards including the Best Film award, Best Director award and Best Actress award for Shabnam.

Overview 
The film depicts the difference of eastern and western culture.

A naive Pakistani villager Raju goes to England to earn money so that he could become a rich person and marry his lover, Rani. When he goes there he gets deceived by a traveling agent who takes all of his money from him. Now the circumstances compel him to marry someone else while his fiancée Rani still awaits for him back in Pakistan.

Cast 
 Shabnam as Rani
 Ejaz Durrani as Raju
 Rahman
 Husna
 Rangeela
 Agha Talish
 Saqi
 Tani

Soundtrack

Release and reception 
The film was released on 7 February 1971 in Pakistan and the UK and was a box office success. It achieved the status of Diamond Jubilee in Karachi cinema with a theatrical run of 100 days.

The Statesman (Pakistan) praised the film's story and said it was "an entertaining film".

Awards and nominations

References

External links 
 

1970s musical drama films
1970s Urdu-language films
1971 films
Films shot in England
Films shot in Pakistan
Nigar Award winners
Pakistani romantic drama films
Pakistani romantic musical films
Urdu-language Pakistani films